The Újpesti TE (canoe-kayak section) was created in 1951 and is one of the most successful canoe-kayak teams in Hungary.

Honours

Olympic medalists
The team's olympic medalists are shown below.

World Championships

European Championships

References

External links
 Official Újpesti TE website
 Club website

Canoeing
Sport in Budapest
Canoe clubs